Shipley by-election may refer to three elections in Shipley, West Yorkshire, England:

 1910 Shipley by-election
 1915 Shipley by-election
 1930 Shipley by-election